Pyrausta sexplagialis is a moth in the family Crambidae. It was described by Max Gaede in 1917. It is found in Equatorial Guinea.

References

Moths described in 1917
sexplagialis
Moths of Africa